Merit badges are awards earned by members of the Boy Scouts of America, based on activities within the area of study by completing a list of periodically updated requirements. The purpose of the merit badge program is to allow Scouts to examine subjects to determine if they would like to further pursue them as a career or vocation. Originally, the program also introduced Scouts to the life skills of contacting an adult they had not met before, arranging a meeting and then demonstrating their skills, similar to a job or college interview. Increasingly, though, merit badges are earned in a class setting at troop meetings and summer camps.

Each merit badge has a pamphlet or booklet associated with it, which contains information on completing the requirements for the badge. Before starting to work on a particular badge, Scouts must meet with their Scoutmasters and obtain a signed application card for it. They must then contact an adult who is registered as a counselor for that badge in order to arrange a meeting and determine which requirements (if any) must be completed ahead of time. The counselor initials the card to indicate the Scout's progress in meeting the requirements, then signs it once they have all been fulfilled. After turning in the completed card to the Scoutmaster, the Scout can receive a patch representing the badge.

The award of a merit badge is represented by a circular patch with an image representing the badge's topic. The patches for the Eagle-required merit badges are distinguishable by the silver ring on the outside edge. Merit badges are displayed on a sash which can be worn with the Boy Scout uniform on formal occasions. Every year the National Council reviews and updates a certain number of merit badges. There are over 100 merit badges (138 as of December 2022).

Scouting organizations in other countries issue or have issued merit badges, including Canada, Indonesia, Japan, Spain, Thailand, and the United Kingdom. Austria has a program similar to merit badges for certain age groups.

Required for Eagle Scout
The current requirements for Eagle Scout, the highest rank in Boy Scouting, involve earning a minimum of 21 merit badges. The following 14 are required:
 Camping
 Personal Fitness
 Personal Management
 Swimming, Hiking, or Cycling
 First Aid
 Citizenship in the Community
 Citizenship in the Nation
 Citizenship in Society (As of July 2022)
 Citizenship in the World
 Cooking
 Family Life
 Emergency Preparedness (E-Prep) or Lifesaving
 Environmental Science or Sustainability
 Communication

As of June 2020, the BSA has also announced plans to introduce a "diversity and inclusion" merit badge that will be required for Eagle Scout in the wake of the Black Lives Matter movement.  This has been named Citizenship in Society and was released on November 1, 2021.

Current badges
The last revision date indicates the date of the latest requirement changes; the copyright or printing dates of merit badge pamphlets may have a different date. The Eagle Scout required merit badges are shaded in gray (see above paragraph for details).

"Colleges"
Merit badge colleges, which are also called fairs, weekends, midways, trail drives, clinics, or jamborees, are events where several troops and counselors meet and focus on teaching merit badges. Larger events are held on college campuses.

Workbooks
Into the 1990s, a number of merit badge counselors developed worksheets as a way for Scouts to document their work. Counselors could teach to a group but still verify each Scout's progress. More recently, worksheets have given way to workbooks with added graph paper, blank maps and diagrams, logs, charts, checklists, links, and other resources as needed. Merit badge workbooks are used by counselors, summer camps, and merit badge colleges. Workbooks have also been developed for ranks, Cub Scout belt loops, and Webelos activity pins.

Historical program
Offered only in 2010, the Historical Merit Badge program, part of the Boy Scouts of America centennial, allowed Scouts to earn the discontinued Carpentry, Pathfinding, Signalling, and Tracking (originally called Stalking) merit badges. The patches for these historical merit badges are distinguished by a gold ring on the outside edge. All were based on merit badges that were among the original 57 issued in 1911.

See also
 Discontinued merit badges (Boy Scouts of America)
 History of merit badges (Boy Scouts of America)
 Original 57 merit badges (Boy Scouts of America)

References

Bibliography

External links

 
 
 
 
 
 
 
 

 Advancement and recognition in the Boy Scouts of America
 Scouting uniform